Abu Khashab is a Syrian town located in Deir ez-Zor District, Deir ez-Zor. According to the Syria Central Bureau of Statistics (CBS), Abu Khashab had a population of 9,046 in the 2004 census.

Syrian Civil War

On 27 April 2022, seven people were shot dead and four others were wounded in a massacre committed by Islamic State fighters when they attacked the house of the chief of the relations office of Deir ez-Zor Civil Council in the town.

References 

Populated places in Deir ez-Zor Governorate